Navliq (also Romanized as Nāvlīq; also known as Navlūq) is a village in Owch Tappeh-ye Gharbi Rural District, Torkamanchay District, Meyaneh County, East Azerbaijan Province, Iran. At the 2006 census, its population was 315, in 63 families.

References 

Populated places in Meyaneh County